Woliczka  is a village in the administrative district of Gmina Świlcza, within Rzeszów County, Subcarpathian Voivodeship, in south-eastern Poland.

References

Woliczka